Barind Tract (alternately called the Varendra Tract in English and Borendro Bhumi in Bengali) is the largest Pleistocene era physiographic unit in the Bengal Basin. It covers most of Dinajpur, Rangpur, Pabna, Rajshahi, Bogra,  and Joypurhat districts of Rajshahi Division and Rangpur Division in Bangladesh as well as entirety of Uttar Dinajpur, Dakshin Dinajpur and most of Maldah districts in West Bengal, India. On the eastern edge of the tract is a lower fault escarpment. Through the fault troughs run the little Jamuna, Atrai and Lower Punarbhaba rivers. To the west, the main area is tilted up, and to the east this area is tilted downwards. The climate of the tract differs from that of much of India, in that more extreme temperature variations (ranging from 45 degrees Celsius down to five degrees Celsius) are encountered there. It is divided into three units: The Recent Alluvial Fan, the Barind Pleistocene, and the Recent Floodplain. These are divided by long, narrow bands of recent alluvium.
Geographical regions

See also
Madhupur tract
Geology of Bangladesh

Footnotes

External links
Map of Barind Tract showing the separate areas

Physiographic divisions
Geography of Bangladesh